Eugenio George Lafita (March 29, 1933 – June 1, 2014) was a Cuban volleyball coach. Nicknamed "Volleyball guru", Lafita led the Cuban women's team to three straight gold medals in the Olympic Games, 1992, 1996 and 2000. In 2000, the Fédération Internationale de Volleyball named George the Best Women's Volleyball Team Coach of the Twentieth Century.

George was born on March 29, 1933, in Baracoa, Cuba. In the 1940s his family moved to Havana running from the economical crisis. His volleyball career started in 1947 at Pepe Barrientos Gymnasium in the Luyano neighborhood in Havana. For more than 40 years he was married to Graciela González until her death in 2007. Eugenio George died in Havana at the age of 81 after a long fight with cancer.

Career 
His coaching career began in 1963 with the Cuban men's junior team. He built up the foundation of the  men's senior team that took the gold medal at the Central American and Caribbean Games in San Juan, Puerto Rico (1966). In 1968 took charge of the  Women's National Team and trained it for 28 years. 
Under the management of George Laffita, the Cubans also clinched titles at the FIVB Women's World Championship in Soviet Union (1978), Brazil (1994) and Japan (1998), the FIVB World Cup in Japan (1989, 1991, 1995 and 1999) and the FIVB World Grand Prix in Quezon City, Philippines (1993) and Hong Kong, China (2000).

George Laffita was the president of the NORCECA Technical and Coaches Commission and he is a member of the FIVB Coaches Commission.

In 2009, the NORCECA Congress in Antigua, Guatemala decided to establish the "Eugenio George Lafita Trophy" to the Most Outstanding Coach of the biennial Women's Continental Championship.

References 

Cuban sportspeople
People from Baracoa
Sportspeople from Havana
Cuban volleyball coaches
1933 births
2014 deaths
Galatasaray S.K. (women's volleyball) coaches